Franeker City Hall (Dutch: Stadhuis van Franeker) is the city hall of the municipality of Franeker, Netherlands, one of the eleven historical cities of Friesland. The building dates from 1591–1594 and was built in Frysian renaissance style.

The first stone was laid on June 24, 1591. The building took a total of three years. Above the main entrance the coat of arms of Friesland is shown, and along the leadlights on the first floor, another 27 coats of arms are placed. It is a national monument and part of the Top 100 Dutch heritage sites. It is a rijksmonument since February 21, 1967, and is one of only three Frisian entries in the Top 100 Dutch heritage sites.

The Dutch House in Brookline, Massachusetts, in the United States of America, was built as a partial copy of the Franeker City Hall, and is itself on the US National Register of Historic Places.

Gallery

References 

Rijksmonuments in Friesland
Franeker